Hamro Nepali Party is a political party in Nepal. The party was registered in the Election Commission on 13 July 2022, with Cane (Lauro; lit. Walking Stick) as its election symbol. The party's chairman is Ananta Raj Ghimire.

History 
The party was founded by 'lauro campaign' activists who were supporters of independent candidates Balen Shah of Kathmandu and Harka Sampang of Dharan, both of whom were elected mayors of their respective cities and had contested the elections using the 'lauro' election symbol at the 2022 local elections. The party registered itself to contest the 2022 general and provincial elections.

The party's candidate Shailendra Man Bajracharya was elected to the Bagmati Provincial Assembly from Kathmandu 8 (A) and the party also won a seat through the party list voting. The party's candidates for House of Representative seats in Kathmandu 8 and Lalitpur 2 finished second in their constituencies.

Electoral performance

General election

Provincial election

See also 

 Rastriya Swatantra Party

References 

Political parties established in 2022
2022 establishments in Nepal
Political parties in Nepal